James Jennings (1670–1739) of Shiplake was an English landowner and  Tory politician who sat in the House of Commons between 1710 and 1722.

Jennings was baptised on 26 June 1670, the eldest son of Robert Jennings, of Shiplake and his wife Mary Jennens daughter of James Jennens of Long Wittenham, Berkshire. His father, Robert was headmaster of John Roysse's Free School in Abingdon (now Abingdon School) from 1657 to 1683 where James was educated. He matriculated at Wadham College, Oxford on 5 July 1686, aged 16; He married  Frances Constantine, daughter of Harry Constantine of Merley and Lake, Dorset in 1698. In 1704, he succeeded his father to the Shiplake estate.

Jennings substituted for his father as High Sheriff of Oxfordshire in the year 1694 to 1695. He was returned as Member of Parliament for Abingdon at a by-election on 13 December 1710. He associated with the Tories being one of the ‘Worthy patriots’. In 1713 he voted against the French commerce bill. He died not stand at the 1713 general election.

Jennings was elected Tory MP for Abingdon again at the  1715 general election and voted consistently against the Government. He was defeated at the 1722 general election when he split the Tory vote in a one-seat constituency. He stood again in 1734 and was again unsuccessful.

Jennings died on 9 March 1739. He had six sons but his eldest son Henry and two others did not survive him. He had four daughters of whom two survived and were left  £4,000 each.

References

See also
 List of Old Abingdonians

1670 births
1739 deaths
Members of the Parliament of Great Britain for English constituencies
People educated at Abingdon School
People from Shiplake
British MPs 1710–1713
British MPs 1715–1722